Sanja Ančić (born 18 July 1988) is a former tennis player from Croatia. She won a total of eight ITF tournaments in singles and one title in doubles. Her highest singles ranking was world No. 159, which she reached on 11 September 2006, and her best doubles ranking 240, reached in March 2007. She retired in 2007.

Biography
Ančić was born in Split to Stipe and Nilda Ančić. She plays right-handed, has a two-handed backhand and is the sister of professional tennis players Ivica and Mario Ančić. She played with her brother in the 2007 Hopman Cup.

ITF finals

Singles: 9 (8–1)

Doubles: 2 (1-1)

References

External links
 
 

1988 births
Living people
Tennis players from Split, Croatia
Croatian female tennis players
Hopman Cup competitors